Johannes Andries Truscott  (born 22 July 1968) is a former South African rugby union player.

Playing career
A product off Grey College in Bloemfontein, Truscott represented the  Schools team at the annual Craven Week tournament in 1986 and was then selected for the South African Schools team. He made his senior provincial debut for Northern Transvaal in 1990.

Truscott toured with the Springboks in 1992 to France and England. He did not play in any test matches for the Springboks but played in four tour matches. In 1993, Truscott received a two-year ban after testing positive for the use of the banned stimulant. Truscott returned during the 1996 season, and represented Northern Transvaal in the inaugural Super 12. He was subsequently included the 1996 Springbok squad for the Tri-Nations, but did not play in any matches.

See also
List of South Africa national rugby union players – Springbok no. 581

References

1968 births
Living people
South African rugby union players
South Africa international rugby union players
Blue Bulls players
Alumni of Grey College, Bloemfontein
People from Alberton, Gauteng
Rugby union players from Gauteng
Rugby union hookers